Sahra Sefid (also Romanized as Şaḩrā Sefīd; also known as Qal‘eh-ye Şaḩrā Sefīd, Sar-i-Sefīd, and Sar Safīd) is a village in Par Zeytun Rural District, Meymand District, Firuzabad County, Fars Province, Iran. At the 2006 census, its population was 325, in 73 families.

References 

Populated places in Firuzabad County